H. Robert Nortz (January 25, 1932 – December 4, 2008) was an American politician who served in the New York State Assembly from the 114th district from 1977 to 2002.

He died of liver cancer on December 4, 2008, in Sarasota, Florida at age 76.

References

1932 births
2008 deaths
Republican Party members of the New York State Assembly
20th-century American politicians